Javad Hardani (born 22 March 1984) is a Paralympic athlete from Iran. He competes in throwing events, and is classified F38, a class for athletes with cerebral palsy.

Javad competed in the 2008 Summer Paralympics where he won the F37/38 discus and finished third in F37/38 javelin. In 2012, at the London Paralympic Games he succeeded in winning a gold medal in the F37/38 discus, breaking the F38 world record in the process.

References

External links
 

1984 births
Living people
People from Ahvaz
Paralympic athletes of Iran
Paralympic gold medalists for Iran
Paralympic silver medalists for Iran
Paralympic bronze medalists for Iran
Athletes (track and field) at the 2004 Summer Paralympics
Athletes (track and field) at the 2008 Summer Paralympics
Athletes (track and field) at the 2012 Summer Paralympics
Athletes (track and field) at the 2016 Summer Paralympics
Medalists at the 2004 Summer Paralympics
Medalists at the 2008 Summer Paralympics
Medalists at the 2012 Summer Paralympics
Medalists at the 2016 Summer Paralympics
World record holders in Paralympic athletics
Paralympic medalists in athletics (track and field)
Iranian male discus throwers
Iranian male javelin throwers
Iranian male shot putters
21st-century Iranian people
Medalists at the 2010 Asian Para Games
Medalists at the 2018 Asian Para Games
World Para Athletics Championships winners
Medalists at the World Para Athletics Championships